The Boys Next Door is a 1985 American adventure-crime drama film about two teenage boys who leave their small town home on the day of their high school graduation and embark on a crime and murder spree.

Plot
Roy Alston (Maxwell Caulfield) and Bo Richards (Charlie Sheen) are two outcasts of their high school community. Bo receives $200 as a graduation gift from his grandparents. Facing a lifetime of working blue collar factory jobs, the boys spontaneously decide to use the money to go on a vacation to Los Angeles.

During the drive to Los Angeles, Bo and Roy rob a gas station and beat the attendant (Joseph Michael Cala) with a crowbar. The next day, the boys go to a beach boardwalk, where Roy throws an empty beer bottle and it hits an elderly woman (Helen Brown) on the forehead. Three young women (Claudia Templeton, Mary Tiffany, and Marilou Conway) see this, and they chase Bo and Roy to a parking lot. The women yell at the boys and damage their car. Enraged, Roy starts the car and drives around in circles in the parking lot with the women still on the hood. After several loops, Roy throws the car into reverse, throwing one of the women from the hood of the car. After the incident, one of the women finds Bo and Roy's dog, Boner the Barbarian, and reads its ID tag, which leads to speculation of where Bo and Roy are from.

During a visit to La Brea Tar Pits, Bo expresses his wish that the world could just "go caveman" for one day, abandoning all rules and order. Roy agrees, and they spend their evening on the streets of Los Angeles.

Several additional encounters lead to more deaths, including a gay man they meet at a bar, Chris, (Paul C. Dancer), a young couple (Richard Pachorek and Lesa Lee), and an older woman Angie Baker (Patti D'Arbanville) whom Roy kills while she is having sex with Bo. Eventually the duo are tracked and found by the LAPD and chased into a shopping mall. After unsuccessfully trying to steal some guns, Bo tries to talk some sense into Roy about surrendering. Roy refuses, and he orders Bo to give him the gun so he can go out in a "blaze of glory". Bo refuses and shoots Roy when he tries to take the gun away. The police surround Bo and ask him why he killed his friend. Bo replies, "Because I had to." Bo is then arrested and led away while reporters snap photos of him.

Cast
 Charlie Sheen as Bo Richards
 Maxwell Caulfield as Roy Alston
 Patti D'Arbanville as Angie Baker
 Christopher McDonald as Detective Mark Woods
 Hank Garrett as Detective Ed Hanley
 Paul C. Dancer as Chris
 Richard Pachorek and Lesa Lee as The Couple
 Kenneth Cortland as Dwayne
 Moon Unit Zappa as Nancy
 Dawn Schneider as Bonnie Roberts
 Kurt Christian as Shakir
 Don Draper as Mr. Heaton
 Blackie Dammett as The Bartender
 Phil Rubenstein as Gutfield
 James Carrington as Ross 
 Grant Heslov as Joe Gonzales
 Michael Lewis as Kanter
 Leonard O. Turner as Sergeant
 Vance Colvig Jr. as Old Man
 Jeff Prettyman as Al
 Claudia Templeton as Girl At Beach
 Ron Ross as Drunk
 Carlos Guitarlos as Patient
 Helen Brown as Old Woman At Beach
 Hettie Lynne Hurtes as Anchorwoman
 Sarah Lilly as Female Officer
 Jimmy Ford as Bob, The Jock 
 Mary Tiffany and Marilou Conway as Women
 James Bolt, Mark Stanton, and Kevi Kendall as Students
 Joseph Michael Cala as Gas Station Owner 
 Carmen Filpi as Bum 
 Christina Beck as Punk Girl
 John Davey as Watkins 
 Geoff Brewer as Security Guard
 Toby Iland as Tom
 Richard Halpern as Boy
 John Escobar and Ray Lykins as Policemen
 Judie David as Female Security Guard 
 Texacala Jones, Pinkie Tessa, Tequila Mockingbird, Maggie Ehrig, and Ted Quinn as members of the Street Band

MPAA cuts
According to director Penelope Spheeris' DVD commentary, The Boys Next Door had to be cut and submitted to the MPAA ten times to get an R rating. Scenes that were cut or changed include:
 The scene where a gas attendant is beaten was shortened to lessen the intensity and sound effects were toned down.
 A scene depicting the murder of Chris was cut down (mostly sound effects were heavily toned down). 
 A scene in which Roy shakes and kills Angie Baker (by breaking her neck) was heavily cut down, with various shots removed to lessen the intensity.

Home media
The Boys Next Door (entitled "No Apparent Motive" in Australia) was released on VHS in 1986 by New World Video. The DVD was released on May 15, 2001, by Anchor Bay Entertainment. The DVD includes commentary by director Spheeris and co-star Caulfield, a trailer and talent bios. The film was later released on Blu Ray by Severin Films.

Critical reception
Time Out London called The Boys Next Door superior to Spheeris' previous work Suburbia (1984) in that it didn't try to sympathize with the two lead characters while still letting in a "glimmer of understanding into the murderers' feelings." Vincent Canby, comparing the film to Over the Edge (1979) for its negative picture of a California teenager and to Badlands (1973) for its "lean and unsentimental" atmosphere, described it as a "very well made, disorienting movie about inarticulated despair and utter hopelessness." He praised the performances of Caulfield, Sheen, and D'Arbanville in the film.

References

External links
 
 

1985 films
1980s crime drama films
1980s crime thriller films
American crime drama films
1980s English-language films
Films directed by Penelope Spheeris
American independent films
American serial killer films
New World Pictures films
Films set in Los Angeles
American LGBT-related films
1985 LGBT-related films
1980s drama road movies
American drama road movies
Films scored by George S. Clinton
1985 drama films
1980s American films